The desert musk shrew (Crocidura smithii) is a species of mammal in the family Soricidae. It is found in Ethiopia, Senegal, and possibly Somalia. Its natural habitat is dry savanna.

References

 Hutterer, R., Howell, K. & Baxter, R. 2004.

Crocidura
Mammals described in 1895
Taxa named by Oldfield Thomas
Taxonomy articles created by Polbot